Fernando Curiel Defossé (27 July 1942 in Mexico City, Mexico – 14/15 August 2021) was a Mexican writer, lawyer and professor at the National Autonomous University of Mexico since 1980.

He attended the National Autonomous University of Mexico. In 1980, Curiel won the Xavier Villaurrutia Award for his essay Onetti: obra y calculate infortunio. He regularly contributed to the El Financiero.

References 

1942 births
2021 deaths
Mexican writers
20th-century Mexican lawyers
National Autonomous University of Mexico alumni
Academic staff of the National Autonomous University of Mexico
People from Mexico City